Hassan Farhang Ansari (born 1970) is an Iranian Islamic scholar and Visiting Professor of Islamic Law and Theology at the Institute for Advanced Study. He is known for his works on Islamic theology, philosophy, law, and legal theory. He is a co-editor of Shii Studies Review.

Works
L’imamat et l’Occultation selon l’imamisme
 Accusations of Unbelief in Islam: A Diachronic Perspective on Takfīr
The Zaydi Reception of Bahshamite Mu'tazilism
Yemeni Manuscript Cultures in Peril

References

1970 births
American Islamic studies scholars
Living people
Iranian Iranologists
Institute for Advanced Study visiting scholars
École pratique des hautes études alumni
Lebanese University alumni
University of Tehran alumni
Qom Seminary alumni